Once Upon a Time in Shanghai, also known as New Bund, is a Hong Kong television series and a remake of the 1980 television series The Bund. It was first aired on TVB in Hong Kong in 1996. The series starred Sunny Chan, Gordon Lam and Adia Chan as the original characters Hui Man-keung, Ting Lik and Fung Ching-ching respectively. It introduced some new changes to the original story, featuring new characters portrayed by Adam Cheng, Carol Cheng and others.

Cast
Adam Cheng as Yu Chun-hoi
Carol Cheng as So Tsat-hau
Sunny Chan as Hui Man-keung
Gordon Lam as Ting Lik
Adia Chan as Fung Ching-ching
Pat Poon as Fung King-yiu
Maggie Cheung as Koo Ching-wah
Patrick Tam as Chan Hon-lam
Gallen Lo as Kwok Say-wai
Eric Tsang as So Chor-ng
Alan Chui Chung-San as General Lung
Noel Leung as Kong Tsi-kwan
Law Ka-ying as Peter
Bowie Lam as Tse Tung
David Lui as Cheung-kwai
Lee Ka-shing as Lok Tin-yau
Florence Kwok as Fong Yim-wun
Shirley Cheung
Emily Kwan

External links

TVB dramas
1996 Hong Kong television series debuts
1996 Hong Kong television series endings
The Bund (TV series)
Television series reboots
Television shows set in Shanghai